Kamina Airport  is an airport serving Kamina, a city in Haut-Lomami Province, Democratic Republic of the Congo.

Airlines and destinations

Accidents and incidents
On June 21, 2007, a Let-410 twin turboprop operated by Karibu Airways crashed into a swamp shortly after taking off from Kamina Airport. One passenger, Mbuyu Mibanga, a member of the National Assembly of the Democratic Republic of the Congo was killed. At least 12 more were injured, including two Congolese doctors working for the World Health Organization.

See also
Transport in the Democratic Republic of the Congo
List of airports in the Democratic Republic of the Congo

References

External links
Kamina Airport at OpenStreetMap
Ville Airport at OurAirports

Kamina Airport at FallingRain

Airports in Haut-Lomami
Kamina